

The Carnegie Museum of the Keweenaw in Houghton, Michigan, is a non-collecting museum that houses changing exhibits about local cultural and natural history. The building is so named as it was built with a 1908 grant from Andrew Carnegie. It served as the public library for Houghton, Michigan from its opening in 1910 until 2006. It is the former building of the Portage Lake District Library. The building was built in 1909, at the site originally occupied by the Armory Building for Company G of the Houghton Light Infantry, using a $15,000 grant from Andrew Carnegie. The museum opened in fall 2006 after the library moved to its new location.

The building was declared a Michigan State Historic Site on June 18, 1976, listed as the Houghton Public Library. On December 30, 1987, the Shelden Avenue Historic District was listed on the National Register of Historic Places, with the library as a contributing property. The building is built in the Classical Revival style.

In October 2013, the museum became a Heritage Site of the Keweenaw National Historical Park.

See also
List of Michigan State Historic Sites in Houghton County, Michigan

References

Bibliography

External links

 Carnegiekeweenaw.org: official Carnegie Museum of the Keweenaw website

Carnegie libraries in Michigan
Buildings and structures in Houghton, Michigan
Museums in Houghton County, Michigan
Michigan State Historic Sites in Houghton County
Library buildings completed in 1909
1909 establishments in Michigan
Museums established in 2006
2006 establishments in Michigan
Neoclassical architecture in Michigan
Historic district contributing properties in Michigan